Spała  is a village in the administrative district of Gmina Inowłódz, within Tomaszów Mazowiecki County, Łódź Voivodeship, in central Poland. The village has a population of 400. It gives its name to the protected area called Spała Landscape Park.

Notable occurrences
 Spala was the location of a hunting lodge owned by Emperor Nicholas II of Russia. In 1912 Grigori Rasputin allegedly healed the Tsarevich Alexei Nikolaevich, who suffered from haemophilia, from a near-fatal hemorrhage.
 Spała was the site of the Central European Jamboree in 1935, and of the International Young Physicists' Tournament in 1995.

Sport
The village is the site of the Olympic Preparation Centre, which is a professional training base for national and Olympic teams of many disciplines. The sports indoor arena was built in 1988 and is among the biggest ones in Poland.

Demographics

Gallery

See also
Sport in Poland
List of indoor arenas in Poland

References

Villages in Tomaszów Mazowiecki County